The tribe Desmodieae is one of the subdivisions of the plant family Fabaceae. It is composed of two subtribes, Desmodiinae and Lespedezinae. Recent phylogenetics has this tribe nested within tribe Phaseoleae.

Genera
The following genera are recognized by the USDA:

Desmodium clade
 Alysicarpus Desv. 1813
 Bouffordia 
 Christia Moench 1802
 Codariocalyx Hassk. 1842
 Desmodiastrum (Prain) A. Pramanik & Thoth. 1986

 Desmodium Desv. 1813—tick clover
 Eleiotis DC. 1825
 Grona 
 Hegnera Schindl. 1924
 Huangtcia 
 Hylodesmum H.Ohashi & R.R.Mill 2000
 Leptodesmia (Benth.) Benth. & Hook. f. 1865

 Mecopus Benn. 1840
 Melliniella Harms 1914
 Monarthrocarpus Merr. 1910

 Ototropis Nees
 Pleurolobus 
 Polhillides 

 Pseudarthria Wight & Arn. 1834
 Puhuaea 
 Pycnospora R. Br. ex Wight & Arn. 1834
 Sohmaea 
 Sunhangia 
 Tateishia 
 Trifidacanthus Merr. 1917
 Uraria Desv. 1813

Lespedeza clade
 Campylotropis Bunge 1835
 Kummerowia Schindl. 1912
 Lespedeza Michx. 1803—bush clovers, Japanese clovers

Phyllodium clade
 Akschindlium H.Ohashi 2003
 Aphyllodium (DC.) Gagnep. 1916
 Arthroclianthus Baill. 1870

 Dendrolobium (Wight & Arn.) Benth. 1852

 Droogmansia De Wild. 1902
 Hanslia Schindl. 1924
 Nephrodesmus Schindl. 1916
 Ohwia H.Ohashi 1999
 Ougeinia Benth. 1852
 Phyllodium Desv. 1813
 Tadehagi H. Ohashi 1973
 Verdesmum H. Ohashi & K. Ohashi 2012

Phylogeny 
The following phylogenetic tree shows the relationships between different genera of the tribe Desmodieae.

References

 
Fabaceae tribes